Southern Railway Passenger Station is a historic train station located at Burlington, Alamance County, North Carolina. It was built in 1892 by the North Carolina Railroad, and is a rectangular, one story red brick and wood building in a Victorian Tudor style.  It features a hipped roof with flared eaves, decorative brackets, and an octagonal tower and two triangular dormers.

It was added to the National Register of Historic Places in 1980. It is located in the Downtown Burlington Historic District.

Current passenger trains stop at a modern station nearby.

References

Railway stations on the National Register of Historic Places in North Carolina
Victorian architecture in North Carolina
Railway stations in the United States opened in 1892
Buildings and structures in Burlington, North Carolina
National Register of Historic Places in Alamance County, North Carolina
Burlington
Individually listed contributing properties to historic districts on the National Register in North Carolina
Former railway stations in North Carolina